Young at Heart was a British television music programme presented by DJ Jimmy Savile and Valerie Masters. Produced by Tyne Tees Television in Newcastle upon Tyne, the show was launched in May 1960 and ran for eight episodes.

Young at Heart was Savile's first television series. Four years after presenting this music show for Tyne Tees, he would become the first presenter of the BBC's Top of the Pops.

References

Bibliography

External links

1960 British television series debuts
1960 British television series endings
1960 in British music
1960s British music television series
Television series by ITV Studios
Pop music television series
English-language television shows
Jimmy Savile
Television shows produced by Tyne Tees Television